This is a list of cities and town in Ethiopia ordered by size and alphabetically.

By population 
The table below shows cities and towns with more than 40,000 inhabitants (from the projection for 2016 by using the 2007 census data). The population numbers are referring to the inhabitants of the cities themselves, suburbs and the metropolitan area outside the city area are not taken into account. Given the suburbs and the metropolitan area, the number of inhabitants might be much larger in several cases. Addis Ababa, for example, might have a total population of 4.5 to 5 million if also taking the metropolitan area into account.

Some towns which should be beyond a number of 40,000 inhabitants (like Holeta) are not shown as the last census happened in 2007. At that time, the area of some towns was different which makes it hard to provide numbers. Also, the last census happened in 2007, which results in major uncertainties. The next major census to account for these issues is foreseen to happen in February 2018.

Alphabetical 
The listings do not have a threshold for the size of the towns and cities.

A 

 Abiy Addi
 Abomsa
 Adama
 Adaba
 Addis Ababa
 Addis Alem (Ejersa)
 Addis Zemen
 Adet
 Adigrat
 Adwa
 Agaro
 Akaki
 Alaba (Kulito, Quliito)
 AlETA WONDO
 Amaro
Gojjam
 Amba Mariam
 Ambo
 Angacha
 Ankober
 ArbaMinch
 Arboye
 Areka
 Asaita
 Asella
 Assosa
 Aware
 Awasa
 Awash
 Axum
 Azezo
 Alamata
 Alem Ketema
 Aykel
Awbarre

B 

 Babille
 Baco
 Badme
 Bahir Dar
 Bati
 Batu
 Bedele
 Bedessa
 Beica
 Bekoji
 Bele
 Bichena
 Bishoftu
 Bitena
 Boditi
 Bonga
 Burie Damot
 Butajira

C 

 Chiro
 Chimdesa
 Chelenko
 Chencha
 Chuahit

D 

 Dabat
 Dangila
 Debarq
 Debre Berhan
 Debre Marqos
 Debre Tabor
 Debre Werq
 Debre Zebit
 Dejen
 Delgi
 Dembecha
 Dembidolo
 Deneba
 Dessie (Dese)
 Dila
 DilYibza (Beyeda)
 Dimtu (Wolaita)
 Dire Dawa
 Dagax buur
 Dirree Incinnii
 Dodola
 Dolo Bay
 Dolo Odo
 Durame
 Dalocha
 Dukem
 Danan (volcano)

E 

 Ejaji
 Elidar
 Enewari
 Estie

F 

 Finicha'a
 Fiche
 Finote Selam
 Freweyni

G 

 Gambela
 Gesuba
 Gelemso
 Ghimbi
 Ginir
 Goba
 Gobiyere
 Gode
 Gololcha
 Gondar
 Gongoma
 Gore
 Gorgora
 Gununo

H 

 Harar
 Hafatissa
 Harorisa
 Hawassa
 Hayq
 Holeta
 Hosaena
 Humera
 Huruta
 Hadero

I 

 Imi

J 

 Jijiga
 Jimma
 Jinka
 Jaragedo

K 

 Kabri Dehar
 Kebri Mangest
 Kercheche
 Kobo
 Kombolcha
 Konso
 Kulubi
 Kurmuk

L 

 Lalibela
 Limmu Inariya
 Lante (Ocholo)
 Lante (Ommo)

M 

 Maji
 Maqora
 Maychew
 Mek'ele
 Mersa
 Mandi
 Metemma
 Metu
 Mizan Teferi
 Mojo
 Mota
 Moyale

N 

 Negash
 Negele Boran
 Nejo
 Nekemte

R 

 Robe, Bale

S 

 Sawla (Gofa Sawla)
 Seka
 Shashamane
 Shaamboo
 Sheraro
 Shire
 Shilavo
 Sodo (Wolaita Sodo)
 Sodore
 Sekota

T 

 Tebela
 Tefki
 Tenta
 Teppi
 Tiya
 Tullu Milki
 Turmi
 Togo-Wochale
 Tulu bolo

W 

 Wacca
 Waliso
 Walwal
 Werder
 Wereta
 Woldia
 Wolleka
 Worabe
 Wuchale
 Wukro
washera

Y 

 Yabelo
 Yeha
 Yirga Alem

Z

See also 
List of cities in East Africa
List of metropolitan areas in Africa
MENA

References

External links 

GIS-based search engine for Ethiopian towns

 
Cities in Ethiopia
Ethiopia, List of cities in
Ethiopia
Ethiopia